Samoyedic can refer to:

 Samoyedic languages
 Proto-Samoyedic language
 Samoyedic peoples